This is the Recorded Music NZ list of number-one albums in New Zealand during the 2010s decade. Adele's 2011 album 21 charted at number one for a total of 38 weeks, and was the top-selling album in both 2011 and 2012. New Zealand vocal trio Sol3 Mio had the top selling album in 2013, despite their self-titled album being released only in November 2013.

In New Zealand, Recorded Music NZ compiles the top 40 albums chart each Monday. Over-the-counter sales of both physical and digital formats make up the data. Certifications are awarded for the number of shipments to retailers. Gold certifications are awarded after 7,500 sales, and platinum certifications after 15,000.

The following albums were all number one in New Zealand in the 2010s.

Number ones
Key
 – Number-one album of the year
 – Album of New Zealand origin
 – Number-one album of the year, of New Zealand origin

Notes

References

Number-one albums
New Zealand Albums
2010s